Van Cauwelaert is a surname. Notable people with the surname include:

Didier Van Cauwelaert (born 1960), French writer
Frans Van Cauwelaert (1880–1961), Belgian politician and lawyer
Jan van Cauwelaert (1914-2016), Belgian Roman Catholic bishop

Surnames of Dutch origin